Henicorhynchus lobatus is a species of freshwater fish in the family Cyprinidae. It is endemic to Indochina (Thailand, Cambodia, Laos, and Vietnam). It is common in the Mekong and also occurs in the Mae Klong and Chao Phraya basins as well as in the associated lowland areas. It is a keystone species in the Mekong.

Habitat and behaviour
Henicorhynchus lobatus occurs in rapids and in slow-flowing water, also in small streams. It is the numerically most abundant fish species in the seasonal migrations occurring in the mainstream Mekong below the Khone Phapheng Falls. This migration is potentially threatened by the proposed hydropower developments.

Fisheries
It is an import species in commercial and small scale fisheries. The estimated total catch in the lower Mekong, about 5,000 tonnes, corresponds to 4% of the total lower Mekong catches.

References

Henicorhynchus
Fish of the Mekong Basin
Fish of Cambodia
Fish of Laos
Fish of Thailand
Fish of Vietnam
Fish described in 1945